Pits is a five player card game, a cross between whist and rummy, with the objective of playing all your cards first.

It is played with a 54 card pack (4 suits and 2 jokers). Threes are low, Aces high, Twos even higher and Jokers highest.

Once all the cards are dealt (the dealer getting 10, the others 11), the dealer plays a meld; one of a singleton, "n" of a kind, a run of 3 or more singletons or a run of three or more "n" of a kinds. For example a run of 4 pairs might be {5,5,6,6,7,7,8,8}.

Subsequent players either pass or play a higher set of the same meld, e.g. {8,8,9,9,10,10,J,J}. Twos and Jokers are wild (they may represent any card), but 2s may not be played in runs of singletons, neither as a 2 nor as a wild card. Using wild cards, it is possible to play a meld of "10 of a kind" - 4 genuine cards, 4 twos and 2 jokers. A run of singletons that is all in the same suit (jokers counting for any suit) is better than a run of different suits, and a 'natural' meld is better than an otherwise equal meld that uses wildcards.

If all other players have passed, the player who played the last (and thus the best) set on the trick plays a new meld. If s/he has no cards left, the lead devolves to the next player who does. The winner of the round is the player who got rid of all his or her cards first.

In one hand, the first player gets 2 points, the second 1 point, the third is dealer for the next hand, the fourth is slightly in the pit and the fifth totally in the pit. In the next hand, the two players in the pit discard their best card, the first players chooses one of the two, the second player gets the other one. These players then discard any card they don't want; Fourth choosing, fifth getting the remaining card. Then dealer leads in this hand.

See also
Pit (game)

External links
 Pits rules

Shedding-type card games
Climbing games